Approaching Normal is the fifth studio album by alternative rock band Blue October. The album was released on March 24, 2009 and debuted at number thirteen on the Billboard charts.

Background 
Justin Furstenfeld unveiled the title and tentative track listing on Blue October's website on January 31, 2008. Pre-production of the album began at the beginning of 2008 with demos being recorded at 5am Studio in Austin, Texas. The recording sessions for the album began on August 18, 2008, and were completed on October 24, 2008, with the band recording the album at Willie Nelson's Pedernales Studios near Austin with Grammy–winning producer Steve Lillywhite. They also recorded part of the album in Sony Recordings in Tokyo, Japan. Post-production was completed on January 8, 2009.

The track listing consists of several new songs, as well as songs that Blue October and 5591 have performed live. A live version of the song "Weight of the World" appeared on Blue October's 2004 album, Argue With a Tree. The song "Say It" was first performed at KDGE's Edgefest 17 on April 27, 2008. The festival was Steve Lillywhite's first time seeing Blue October perform, and the band's set, especially the song "Say It" cemented his desire to produce Blue October's next album.

During an interview with the music webzine Playback:Stl, Justin described the song "Blue Skies" as being one of the few happy songs he has written, saying, "There's nothing negative about it. It's all about beauty. It's really, really pretty and really, really happy, but it's going to be rocked out so crazy that people will kind of forget that it's a lovey lovey, dovey song."

During concerts on July 4 and 5, 2008, Justin Furstenfeld confirmed that "Say It" and "Weight of the World" would be on the new album. On July 23, 2008, during a web chat with fans, Jeremy Furstenfeld confirmed the song "Dirt Room" would be on the album, and that of the new songs the band was recording, it was his favorite. Justin Furstenfeld first performed the songs "Blue Skies" and "My Never" at Stephenie Meyer's Breaking Dawn concerts in August 2008. Furstenfeld also confirmed March 2009 as the anticipated release date for the album.

The first single from the album, "Dirt Room" was performed live by the band during concerts in December 2008. Immediately following the concerts, radio stations in Austin, Dallas and Houston put the song into rotation. The single reached radio nationally on January 13, 2009, and was available to digital outlets on December 23, 2008. The song "Say It" is the second single and was released on April 24, 2009. The song "Should Be Loved" is the third single.

Blue October released the song "Graceful Dancing" via an email gift to the public on January 7, 2009. The song "Kangaroo Cry" was released on the NCIS official soundtrack on February 10, 2009 and featured in the coda of the season 7 Christmas episode, "Faith".

The album was released for pre-order on March 3, 2009. Approaching Normal entered the Billboard 200 chart at number 13 with sales of 33,778 and fell out of the top 50 in its second week. It also peaked at number 5 on the Top Rock Albums chart. The album has sold 185,978 to date.

Controversy
The song "The End" is about a man whose wife leaves him for a new lover. The man sneaks into his house and sees his wife and her new lover having sex and murders them both before turning the gun on himself. The song's controversial lyrics were used against Justin Furstenfeld during his divorce and parental custody hearing, with his ex-wife's lawyer claiming that the song was written about her and was released in order to threaten her. Justin claimed that the song was written about an incident that occurred in a neighborhood where he lived before he met his ex-wife.

Song selection 
On October 21, 2008, Justin Furstenfeld confirmed the twelve songs to be released on the album. and that two versions of the album would be released; one version with explicit lyrics, and one version with censored lyrics. A different bonus track would be included on each version.  Approaching Normal is also the first Blue October album to be released on vinyl, with the vinyl version including all the bonus tracks.

Critical reception 

Approaching Normal garnered mixed reviews from music critics. Billboard contributor Christa L. Titus praised Steve Lillywhite's production for delivering on the band's "penchant for emotive playing and tight rock chops", and Justin Furstenfeld's writing for crafting scenarios involving "lullabies to children ("Blue Does") and plucky life affirmations ("Jump Rope")". Clark Collis of Entertainment Weekly called the album "an often gloomy yet commercial-sounding collection" that gravitates towards Twilight author Stephenie Meyer and its fans for having "heartfelt muscularity" in the lyricism. Conversely,  AllMusic's Andrew Leahey saw it as a smorgasbord of "post-grunge missteps and ill-advised detours into genres [far] beyond the band's grasp", criticizing Furstenfeld for being overly theatrical when singing unintentionally funny lyrics and added that his "vocal resemblance of Jack Black" and a reworking into the "tongue-in-cheek outlandishness" that Tenacious D have created before would make the record more listenable, concluding that "Blue October remain totally unaware of their own absurdity, however, which makes Approaching Normal the sort of cringe-worthy drama fest that inspires a ton of laughs but few repeated listens." Rolling Stone writer Mark Kemp also lamented Furstenfeld for disrupting his tragicomic melodrama with "self-indulgent pathos" to add to his band's growingly intolerable "post-grunge whinefest".

Track listing

Personnel 
 Justin Furstenfeld - vocals, guitar
 Jeremy Furstenfeld - drums, percussion
 Ryan Delahoussaye - violin, mandolin, keyboard, vocals
 C.B. Hudson - guitar, vocals
 Matt Noveskey - bass and acoustic guitars, vocals
 Produced by Steve Lillywhite
 Mixed by Steve Lillywhite and CJ Eiriksson
 Engineered by CJ Eiriksson
 Mastering: Gavin Lurssen at Lurssen Mastering
 Co-writer for "The End": Patrick Leonard
 A&R: Paul Nugent for Brando Records
 Executive Producer: Sylvia Rhone
 A&R Coordination: Elizabeth Vago for Universal Motown
 A&R Administration: Michele Goldberg for Universal Motown
 Art Direction: Joe Spix and Justin Furstenfeld
 Design: Joe Spix
 Photography: Chapman Baehler
 Photo Model: Kathryn Olsen
 Management: Paul Nugent, Mike Swinford and Randy Miller for Rainmaker Artists
 Booking Agent: Kevin Daly for Monterey International
 Label: Brando/Universal Motown

References 

2009 albums
Blue October albums